Hamatastus is a genus of beetles in the family Cerambycidae, containing the following species:

 Hamatastus conspectus Monné, 1985
 Hamatastus excelsus Monné, 1978
 Hamatastus fasciatus Gilmour, 1957
 Hamatastus lemniscatus Monné, 1985
 Hamatastus simillimus Monné, 1990

References

Acanthocinini